Towhidabad (also Romanized as Towḩīdābād; also known as Towḩīd) is a village in Daland Rural District, in the Central District of Ramian County, Golestan Province, Iran. At the 2006 census, its population was 171, in 36 families.

References 

Populated places in Ramian County